The 1999–2000 Women's National Cricket League season was the fourth season of the Women's National Cricket League, the women's domestic limited overs cricket competition in Australia. The tournament started on 30 October 1999 and finished on 18 December 1999. Defending champions New South Wales Breakers won the tournament for the fourth time after topping the ladder at the conclusion of the group stage and beating Western Fury by two games to zero in the finals series.

Ladder

Fixtures

1st final

2nd final

References

 
Women's National Cricket League seasons
 
Women's National Cricket League